

League tables

First Division

Promotion/relegation Series 
 
No relegations.

Second Division

JSL promotion/relegation Series 

Honda promoted, Hitachi Ibaraki relegated.

All-Star Game

References
1974 season

1974
1
Jap
Jap